Gertjan Verbeek (born 1 August 1962) is a Dutch former professional footballer who last managed Eerste Divisie side Almere City.

Coaching career

Netherlands
After retiring from his playing career in 1994, Verbeek stayed with SC Heerenveen as an assistant-coach. He left for Heracles Almelo in 2001, and after a successful stint there was hired as the successor to Foppe de Haan with SC Heerenveen. In 2008, he was hired by Feyenoord, but was fired after clashing with players a few months into his tenure. He moved to Heracles Almelo for the 2009–2010 season, and after guiding them to a 6th-place finish in the Eredivisie, AZ hired him for the 2010–2011 season. Verbeek caused controversy in December 2011 in a 2011–12 KNVB Cup match against Ajax by leading AZ off the pitch in protest at having their goalkeeper Esteban Alvarado sent off for retaliating against a pitch invader. The game was consequently abandoned. On 29 September 2013, AZ fired him due to lack of chemistry with the players.

Germany
The German football club 1. FC Nürnberg hired him on 22 October 2013, giving him the first coaching opportunity outside of Netherlands, with a contract until 30 June 2015. However, he was sacked on 23 April 2014. On 22 December 2014, the VfL Bochum announced signing Verbeek as head coach, starting 1 January 2015. In his return to Nuremberg on 23 March 2015, Bochum defeated 1. FC Nürnberg 2–1. He was sacked on 11 July 2017.

FC Twente
On 29 October 2017 he returned to management in his native Holland, where he signed with FC Twente, which was going through a disastrous campaign of the 2017-18 Eredivisie. On 26 March, after 149 days, Verbeek was fired as FC Twente's manager, with the team at the bottom of the table with six games remaining of the season.

Adelaide United
On 23 May 2019, Verbeek was officially announced as Marco Kurz' replacement as manager for A-League club Adelaide United. Verbeek led Adelaide United to their third FFA Cup victory by defeating Melbourne City 4–0 at Coopers Stadium. Due to the COVID-19 pandemic, Verbeek took a leave of absence to return home to the Netherlands indefinitely while still being under contract with the club. Verbeek and Adelaide United decided to mutually part ways on 29 April 2020.

Career statistics

Playing career

Coaching record

Honours
AZ
KNVB Cup: 2012–13

Adelaide
 FFA Cup: 2019

References

Living people
1962 births
Footballers from Deventer
Dutch footballers
Dutch association football commentators
Association football defenders
Eredivisie players
Eerste Divisie players
SC Heerenveen players
Heracles Almelo players
Dutch football managers
Dutch expatriate football managers
Dutch expatriate sportspeople in Australia
Dutch expatriate sportspeople in Germany
Expatriate soccer managers in Australia
Expatriate football managers in Germany
Eredivisie managers
Bundesliga managers
A-League Men managers
Feyenoord managers
Heracles Almelo managers
SC Heerenveen managers
AZ Alkmaar managers
1. FC Nürnberg managers
VfL Bochum managers
FC Twente managers
Adelaide United FC managers
SC Heerenveen non-playing staff
FC Twente non-playing staff